Gimmigela Chuli, or The Twins, are two-peak mountains in the Himalayas, located on the border between Taplejung, Mechi, Nepal and Sikkim, India.

Location 
It is situated approximately  NNE from Kangchenjunga.

This subpeak, sometimes referred to as "Gimmigela's Sister", lies entirely within India. Together the two peaks, Gimmigela I and Gimmigela II, are known as "The Twins".

Climbing history
A Japanese expedition attempted to reach the west (main) summit in 1993 via the east ridge from Sikkim, ending on 18 October 1993 after the death of expedition leader Masanori Sato. The team had achieved the first ascent of Gimmigela II and were on the summit ridge connecting the two peaks in an attempt to summit Gimmigela I when Sato fell 35 meters into a hidden crevasse. Despite the efforts of the other team members, his body was not recovered and the expedition was terminated.

One year later in October 1994, Taroh Tanigawa, Koji Nagakubo and Yuichi Yoshida, members of the failed attempt in 1993, achieved the first ascent of Gimmigela I.

References

External links
 Gimmigala Chuli on Peakery

Mountains of Koshi Province
Mountains of Sikkim
India–Nepal border
International mountains of Asia
Seven-thousanders of the Himalayas